Muhammad Ali is a 2021 four-part documentary miniseries about Muhammad Ali. The series was directed by Ken Burns, Sarah Burns, and David McMahon.

The documentary had its premiere at the 48th Telluride Film Festival on September 2, 2021. It later premiered on PBS on September 19, 2021.

Episodes

Reception
On review aggregator website Rotten Tomatoes, the series has an approval rating of 100% based on 14 reviews, with an average rating of 8/10. According to Metacritic, which assigned a weighted average score of 88 out of 100 based on 9 critics, it received "universal acclaim".

Jeremy Schapp of ESPN called, "It is a stupendous achievement."

Finn Cohen of The New York Times called it, "A sweeping achievement."

Peter Keough of The Boston Globe called it, "Exhilarating."

Adam Buckman of MediaPost wrote, "The most satisfying, riveting and moving TV experience of the year."

References

External links

PBS original programming
2020s American documentary television series
Documentary television series about sports